Conseil may refer to:

Government
 Conseil d'État (disambiguation), various governments or governmental organizations
 Conseil des Etats, the smaller chamber of the Federal Assembly of Switzerland
 Conseil de l'Entente, a West African regional co-operation forum
 Conseil du Roi, the administrative and governmental apparatus around the king of France during the Ancien Régime
 Conseil régional, the elected assembly of a region of France
 Conseil scolaire Centre-Nord, a French language school board in Alberta, Canada

Other uses
 Conseil Hill, a hill on Porquoi Pas island, Antarctica
 Conseil, a character in the Jules Verne novel Twenty Thousand Leagues Under the Sea

See also
 Conseil supérieur de la langue française (disambiguation)
 Advice (disambiguation)
 Council (disambiguation)